Amal (or 'labor') is a unisex given name of Hebrew and Arabic origin. It is mentioned in the Books of Chronicles of Hebrew bible. Notable people with the name include:

 Amal Abul-Qassem Donqol (1940–1983), Egyptian poet
 Amal Aden (born 1983), Somali–Norwegian writer
 Amal Arafa (born 1970), Syrian actress
 Amal Bayou (–2017), Libyan microbiologist and politician
 Amal Clooney (born 1978), Lebanese-British lawyer, activist, and author
 Amal Dutta (1930–2016), Indian footballer and manager
 Amal Habani, Sudanese journalist
 Amal Hijazi (born 1978), Lebanese pop singer
 Amal ibn Idris al-Alami (born 1950), Moroccan physician
 Amal Kassir (born 1995), Syrian American spoken word poet
 Amal Maher (born 1985), Egyptian singer
 Amal Mansour (1950–2018), Palestinian-Jordanian author and translator
 Amal McCaskill (born 1973), American basketball player
 Amal Murkus, Palestinian singer
 Amal Nasser el-Din (born 1928), Israeli author
 Amal Neerad (born 1983), Indian cinematographer, film director, and producer
 Amal Salha (born 2000), Lebanese footballer
 Amal Silva (born 1960), Sri Lankan cricketer

See also
 Amel (name)
 Emal, given name
 Emel, Turkish given name
 Little Amal, a giant puppet
 unrelated names: Amalia, Amaliah, Amelia

References

Arabic unisex given names